The Massachusetts Archaeological Society is an archaeological society based at the Robbins Museum, which it also runs, at Middleborough, Massachusetts. It publishes a scholarly journal, the Bulletin of the Massachusetts Archaeological Society, and is a member of the Eastern States Archeological Federation.

References 

Archaeological organizations
Organizations based in Massachusetts
Middleborough, Massachusetts
Organizations with year of establishment missing